The 2015 Campeonato Acriano de Futebol was the 69th edition of the Acre's top professional football league. The competition began on 1 March and ended on 27 June. Rio Branco won the championship for the 45th time.

First stage

Semi-finals

First leg

Second leg

Finals

References 

Acre
Campeonato Acreano seasons